Knudsen's Second Cabinet was the government of Norway from 31 January 1913 to 21 June 1920, led by prime minister Gunnar Knudsen. It was a Liberal Party minority government. It was formed following Jens Bratlie's defeat in the 1912 election. 

Knudsen had originally asked king Haakon VII to resign on 4 February 1919 following a majority vote against the cabinet's proposal of a tighter economic policy, but the king advised his cabinet to continue on 20 February. All except three ministers, withdrew their resignations. The same issue became the reason for the cabinet's second resignation on 16 June 1920, and this time the king accepted it. The resignation was accepted on 19 June, and came into force two days later, when the cabinet was succeeded by Bahr Halvorsen's First Cabinet.

Cabinet composition

|}

Notes

References

Cabinet of Norway
Cabinets established in 1913
Cabinets disestablished in 1920
Cabinets involving the Liberal Party (Norway)